The Safi Qoli Caravansarai is a historical caravanserai related to the Safavid dynasty and is located in Juyom.

References 

Caravanserais in Iran